The 2012 Morgan State Bears football team represented Morgan State University in the 2012 NCAA Division I FCS football season. They were led by 12th-year head coach Donald Hill-Eley and played their home games at Hughes Stadium. They are a member of the Mid-Eastern Athletic Conference (MEAC). Morgan State finished the season 3–8, 2–6 in MEAC play to finish in a tie for ninth place.

Schedule

Source: Schedule

References

Morgan State
Morgan State Bears football seasons
Morgan State Bears football